Wooroloo Prison Farm is an Australian minimum-security prison located in Wooroloo, Western Australia. It was established in 1972 under an arrangement that it would offer some of its amenities to the community of Wooroloo. It was previously the site of a sanatorium.

History 
The Wooroloo Sanatorium was officially opened on 1 May 1915, designed by two Western Australian Principal Architects, Hillson Beasley and William Hardwick

The complex operated as a tuberculosis sanatorium until 1959. From 1960 to 1970, the former sanatorium operated as a geriatric and district hospital. Since 1970, the former sick staff ward has remained in use as the Wooroloo hospital. Since 1970, the site has operated as a minimum-security
prison for short-term offenders.

Approved prisoners are able to work under supervision in the local community and are involved in reforestation and environmental programs, training at local businesses and general community projects.

The prison's large industries complex produces goods for the prison system and for external contracts including prison food, offsetting some of the costs of prisoner management.

Prisoners are taught workshop skills and can take part in traineeships to help them find a job when they are released from prison.

References

External links
Corrective Services - Wooroloo Prison Farm
Wooroloo Prison Farm

1972 establishments in Australia
Prisons in Western Australia
Wooroloo, Western Australia